Hae Mo-su was the founder of Buyeo. According to the Samguk Sagi, Hae Mo-su was the father of Goguryeo's founder, Jumong. According to the Samguk Yusa, Hae Mo-su was the son of heaven, riding in a chariot of five dragons, to establish Bukbuyeo (Northern Buyeo).

Connection with Jumong 
According to legend, Jumong is the child of Haemosu and Yuhwa, daughter of Habaek, the god of the Amnok River or, according to an alternative interpretation, the sun god Haebak. However, Hae Mo-su does not appear in older Chinese records or on the Gwanggaeto Stele that describe Goguryeo's founding. It is thought that Goguryeo integrated the founding legend of Buyeo after the former conquered the latter.

Family
Consorts : Lady Yuhwa (유화부인) 
Son: Dongmyeong of Goguryeo (동명성왕)

Popular culture
 Portrayed by Heo Joon-ho in the 2006-2007 MBC TV series Jumong.

 Part of the "Heaven's Brethren" item set, a piece of Armor called "Haemosu's Adamant" in the 2000 pc game Diablo II.

See also 
 List of Korean monarchs
 History of Korea

References 

Buyeo rulers
2nd-century BC rulers in Asia
2nd-century BC Korean people
Founding monarchs